Colonel March is a fictional detective created by American writer John Dickson Carr. He appeared in a number of short stories written in the 1930s and 1940s of "impossible crime" mysteries. He was an official attached to Scotland Yard in the so-called Department of Queer Complaints.

Carr based March on Major John Street, MC, OBE with whom he had co-written the novel Drop to His Death.

Colonel March was portrayed by Boris Karloff in the 1950s British TV series, Colonel March of Scotland Yard.

References

Fictional British police detectives
Novel series
Characters in American novels